Jasbir Singh Bajaj was an Indian physician and diabetologist. He was awarded the Padma Vibhushan, India's second-highest civilian award, for his outstanding contribution to the medical sciences and research, and his efforts to improve the healthcare delivery system.  Earlier he was decorated with the Padma Shri in 1981 and the Padma Bhushan in 1982. He was the ninth person in the country  to receive the award for services in the field of medicine and research.

Bajaj was a member (health) of the Planning Commission with the rank of Minister of state in 1991–98. He joined the AIIMS faculty in 1966 and in 1979 was appointed professor and head of medicine. He was appointed honorary physician to the President of India during 1977-1982 and again from 1987 to 1992. He was also consultant physician to the Prime minister from 1991 to 1996. He was a fellow of the Royal College of Physicians of London as well as of Edinburgh, and of the National Academy of Medical Sciences. He was also a founder fellow of the Indian College of Physicians.
Prof. Bajaj died on January 8, 2019.

References

Living people
Recipients of the Padma Vibhushan in medicine
Medical doctors from Punjab, India
Indian endocrinologists
Recipients of the Padma Shri in medicine
Academic staff of the All India Institute of Medical Sciences, New Delhi
Recipients of the Padma Bhushan in medicine
Fellows of the National Academy of Medical Sciences
Indian diabetologists
20th-century Indian medical doctors
Year of birth missing (living people)